Larry L. Richman (born 1955) is a social media expert, Internet strategist, publishing executive, project management trainer, and author of over a dozen books, numerous book translations, and articles in professional journals and magazines. He is a translator in three languages.

Online strategist and social media professional
Richman is an online strategist with a specialty in using social media in product marketing. He is the former Director of Communications for the Church of Jesus Christ of Latter-day Saints (LDS Church) to market the church's educational materials to members and leaders worldwide.

Since 2006, he has written daily articles at LDSMediaTalk.com and LDS365.com, his professional blog about LDS Church materials and using social media and technology responsibly. The blog has a total reach of 100,000 from 168 countries.

Richman directed the content and services of LDS.org, coordinating with all the websites of the LDS Church, such as Mormon.org, FamilySearch.org, JosephSmith.net, and JesusChrist.lds.org. He was the domain portfolio manager of the church’s hundreds of web properties with tens of thousands of web pages (plus millions of pages of documents in the Gospel Library in many languages). LDS Church websites are visited by over 50 million people each month   Richman directed a redesign and rebuild of LDS.org from 2004-2007, implementing XML, metadata and taxonomy standards, a content management system, web portal server technology, new web search tools, and a strategy for Search Engine Optimization.

Project management
Richman is a certified PMP (Project Management Professional), consultant, and trainer. He has authored seven books on project management, including two college texts.

Richman directed the Publications and Media Project Office that manages the creation of 8,000 printed, media, and web products a year in up to 185 languages. This included managing the projects for writing, editing, translation, production, printing, and international distribution in 105 offices worldwide.

Publishing

Richman directed the processes and systems for print and web publishing at the LDS Church.

He is the President and CEO of Century Publishing, a custom media publisher based in Salt Lake City, Utah. It publishes books and other media in both English and Spanish on topics including religion, social issues, business, biographies, and children's books. Founded in 1981, Century Publishing was previously known as "Richman Communications" and "Richman Publishing". The name was changed to Century Publishing in 1995.

Author and speaker
He has authored over a dozen books, several book translations (in English, Spanish, and Cakchiquel), and has published articles in professional journals and magazines.

Books
 
 
 
 
 
 
 
 
 
 

Articles

 Syndicated author for Meridian Magazine with over 125 published articles.

Speaker
 National speaker on self-help topics  and technology issues.

References

External links
 LDS365
 
 Latter-day Saint Missionaries in the Guatemala Earthquake of 1976

1955 births
American Latter Day Saints

Living people
Mormon bloggers
People from Brigham City, Utah
Blogs about Mormons and Mormonism
Mormon missionaries in Guatemala